Parotis angustalis is a moth in the family Crambidae. It was described by Snellen in 1895. It is found in Indonesia (Borneo).

References

Moths described in 1895
Spilomelinae